Nana is the debut album of the German rapper Nana, released on May 19, 1997. It was certified Gold by the German Bundesverband Musikindustrie and Swiss Hitparade. The album consists of eleven tracks and spawned four singles: "Darkman", "Let It Rain" (featuring Saskia Mireille Oldenstam), "He's Comin'" and "Lonely". The album's design was made by Katja Stier.

The album is dedicated to Nana's deceased mother Angela Adu-Adjei, who died of brain cancer.

Track listing

Year-end charts

References

1997 debut albums
Nana (rapper) albums